Ryan Adams (born May 14, 1991), known professionally as Ryland Adams, is an American YouTuber.

Career
In 2014, he became an on-air host and producer for Clevver, an online pop culture media company. Adams later left Clevver in 2017, citing questionable business practices. Adams entered into a relationship with fellow YouTuber Shane Dawson in 2016, with whom he frequently collaborates; Adams is primarily known for his YouTube vlogs about his life. In October 2020, Adams announced and released the first episode of his podcast The Sip, alongside his co-host, Lizze Gordon. As of September 2022, his main channel videos have received a combined total of over 554 million views.

In 2019, Adams received the Shorty Award for Vlogger of the Year.

Personal life
Ryland Adams has been dating YouTuber Shane Dawson since 2016. In March 2019, they became engaged after Dawson proposed to Adams. Ryland and Dawson share a home in Parker, Colorado.

On January 3, 2023, Adams and Dawson were married in Colorado.

Filmography

Web

Podcast

Awards and nominations

References

External links
 
 
 

1991 births
American gay actors
American gay writers
LGBT people from California
LGBT YouTubers
Living people
Shorty Award winners
20th-century American LGBT people
21st-century American LGBT people
YouTubers from California